Ingolf is a masculine given name. It may also refer to:

Places
 Ingolf Fjord (Ingolf Inlet), Greenland, Denmark; a sound in northeast Greenland
 Ingolf Fjeld (Ingolf Mesa), Greenland, Denmark; a mountain in southeast Greenland
 Ingolf, Ontario, Canada; an unincorporated region of Kenora district

Transportation
 , a ship name of the Royal Danish Navy
 R/V Ingolf, a Danish oceanographic ship memorialized in a frieze at the Oceanographic Museum of Monaco

Other uses
 Eva Ingolf, Icelandic violinist

See also